Wendell Smith may refer to:

Wendell Smith (sportswriter) (1914–1972), American baseball writer
Wendell Smith (actor) (active c.1977–2010), Canadian actor

See also
Wendel Smith (active 1935), American football coach